This is a list of flag bearers who have represented Tunisia at the Olympics.

Flag bearers carry the national flag of their country at the opening ceremony of the Olympic Games.

See also
Tunisia at the Olympics

References

Tunisia at the Olympics
Tunisia
Olympic flagbearers
Olympic flagbearers